Tarp may refer to:
 Tarpaulin, a large sheet of strong, flexible, water resistant or waterproof material
 Tarp tent
 Tarp, Germany, a municipality in Schleswig-Holstein in Germany
 Tarp, Iran, a village in East Azerbaijan Province, Iran
 Finn Tarp, Danish economist
 Fritz Tarp, Danish footballer 
 Lotte Tarp, Danish actress 

TARP or T.A.R.P. may refer to:
 TARP (gene), a gene in humans
 Troubled Asset Relief Program, U.S. government financial bailout plan of 2008
 Terminal Identifier – Address Resolution Protocol, protocol defined in Telcordia
 Tunnel and Reservoir Plan, Chicago's Deep Tunnel
 Transmembrane AMPAR regulatory protein
 Translocated actin-recruiting phosphoprotein 
 Tactical Airborne Reconnaissance Pod System, US Navy camera pod on the F-14